Margaret J. Vergeront (born May 6, 1946) is an American attorney and retired judge.  She served 18 years on the Wisconsin Court of Appeals in the Madison-based District IV court.

Biography
Vergeront was born on May 6, 1946, in Madison, Wisconsin.  She is a graduate of the University of Wisconsin-Madison and the University of Wisconsin Law School.

Career
Vergeront was a law clerk to United States District Judge James Edward Doyle from 1975 to 1976; Doyle's son Jim Doyle later served as Governor of Wisconsin.  Following her time working for Judge Doyle, she worked as a staff attorney for Legal Action of Wisconsin, a nonprofit providing pro bono legal services. In 1984, she went into private practice in Madison and continued until her election to the Wisconsin Court of Appeals in 1994.

She was unopposed in the 1994 election to a newly created seat on the District IV court.  She was subsequently reelected in 2000 and 2006, never facing an opponent.  She retired from the court in 2012.

References

External links
 
 Margaret J. Vergeront at Court Listener
 Legal Action Wisconsin

|-

Politicians from Madison, Wisconsin
Wisconsin Court of Appeals judges
Wisconsin lawyers
University of Wisconsin–Madison alumni
University of Wisconsin Law School alumni
1946 births
Living people
American women judges
Lawyers from Madison, Wisconsin
21st-century American women